Notochilus is a genus of mostly European bugs in the tribe Drymini (family Rhyparochromidae), erected by Franz Xaver Fieber in 1864.  The species Notochilus limbatus is recorded from northern Europe including the British Isles.

Species 
The Lygaeoidea Species File lists:
 Notochilus crassicornis (Baerensprung, 1858)
 Notochilus damryi Puton, 1871
 Notochilus ferrugineus (Mulsant & Rey, 1852)- type species (as Pachymerus ferrugineus Mulsant, E. & C. Rey)
 Notochilus limbatus Fieber, 1870

See also
 List of heteropteran bugs recorded in Britain

References

External links
 

Drymini
Hemiptera of Europe
Pentatomomorpha genera